Perfect Creek is a stream in the U.S. state of Ohio.

Perfect Creek was named for William Perfect, a pioneer who settled near it in 1807.

See also
List of rivers of Ohio

References

Rivers of Delaware County, Ohio
Rivers of Licking County, Ohio
Rivers of Ohio